Reddyanus bilyi is a species of scorpion in the family Buthidae. It is endemic to Australia.

Etymology
The epithet bilyi honours Svatopluk Bílý of Prague, who collected the type specimen.

Description
The base colouration of the female holotype is yellow, with numerous black markings. The length is 26.1 mm.

Distribution
The type locality is Kuranda in Far North Queensland.

References

bilyi
Animals described in 2003
Scorpions of Australia
Arthropods of Queensland
Endemic fauna of Australia